Yazmith Bataz Carballo (born April 5, 1972), is a Mexican athlete specializing in 100 meter, 200 meter, and 400 meter events.

Career
Bataz has been a member of Mexico's athletics team at the Athens 2004, Beijing 2008, and London 2012 Paralympic Games.

At the continental level, she has represented her country at the 2007 Parapan American Games in Rio de Janeiro, where she received her first gold medal in the 100 meters. At the 2011 Parapan American Games in Guadalajara, she won a gold medal in the 100 meters and silver medals in the 200 meters and 400 meters within the T54 category for wheelchair racers.

On August 16, 2007, in Rio, Bataz broke the Pan-American record in the women's 100 meters T54 category with a time of 18:55. Additionally, in Guadalajara in 2011, she set a new continental record with 17:46 in the same event.

Honors
In 2014, Yazmith Bataz received the Medal of Merit For a Person With a Disability from the government of her home state of Baja California Sur.

In 2016 she was appointed Municipal Coordinator for the Inclusion of Persons With Disabilities for her hometown of La Paz. She has represented the city at conferences of the National Human Rights Commission.

References

1972 births
Living people
People from La Paz, Baja California Sur
Sportspeople from Baja California Sur
Mexican female wheelchair racers
Track and field athletes with limb difference
Amputee category Paralympic competitors
Paralympic athletes of Mexico
Athletes (track and field) at the 2004 Summer Paralympics
Athletes (track and field) at the 2008 Summer Paralympics
Athletes (track and field) at the 2012 Summer Paralympics
Medalists at the 2011 Parapan American Games